Ratodero is the capital of Ratodero Taluka, a sub-division of Larkana District in the Sindh province of Pakistan. Situated some 28 km from the district capital Larkana. Since the independence of Pakistan, the city is known for its sweet products and handmade caps known as Sindhi topi. At present the principal trade of the town is that of paddy and rice, with many rice mills located here.

Geography 
Ratodero is the administrative headquarters of the Taluka of the same name, and is located on the way from Larkana to Shikarpur. As a regional transportation hub, many roads lead from Ratodero to surrounding towns and villages, such as Gharrhi Khairo, Jacobabad, Shahdad Kot, Kamber, MiroKhan, and Naudero.

Administration
Ratodero Taluka is administratively subdivided into 9 Union Councils:
 Behman
 Bunguldero
 Jumo Agham
 Naudero
 Wada Bosan
 Pir Bakhsh Bhutto
 Rarodero-I
 Ratodero-II
 maso Dero
 Waris Dino Machi
 Ahmed Khan Lashari
 Ahmed Khan Jalbani
 Wazir Khan Jalbani

Government departments
There are many government offices in the town including 
 Mukhtiarkar office
 Taluka Education Offices (Male & Female) 
 Sub court
 Taluka Police headquarters
 Executive Engineer WAPDA
 Sui southern gas office
 Sub rural health centre
 Sixty-bed hospital
 Post office 
 Government high school
 Degree college
 SARCO (NGO)
 Government Monotechnique College
 Government Technical Training Center
In addition to that there are branches of the following banks in the town 
 Habib Bank
 National Bank
 United Bank
 National Saving Organization
 Sindh Bank
 AL-Habib Bank
 MCB-Muslim Commercial Bank
 ABL-Allied Bank
 Khush-hali Bank
 U Bank
 First Microfinance Bank
 Kashaf Foundation (NGO)
 SRSO-Sindh Rural Support Organization (NGO)

Political hub 

:'
Ratodero is considered to be political Qa'aba of Pakistan Peoples Party as grave of Zulfiqar Ali Bhutto and first female Prime Minister Benazir Bhutto is situated in this Taluka but the city Ratodero has been badly neglected by the political leaders since long, as there is no any prominent educational institution in the city, there is no any water supply system in the city, there is no hospital to deal with emergency situations. The government of Bhuttos have neglected the city as the Cadet college, Rice Research Institute, Airport and Industrial Estate have been established in other Talukas of the district whereas the City Ratodero lacks all of it, even the citizens of city have no access to safe drinking water.

Sources
 Your Government
 Ratodero Home page
Ratodero had many landlords during colonial rule. Famous were Gokal Das and Wadero Ghualm Kadir Dayo(Kadri septs) Wadero Ghulam Kadir Dayo. The most efficient, assertive, and well-known personality in the beginning of the 20th Century, among pioneer members of the council of the Commissioner in Sindh and advisory body under Bombay presidency, Ghulam Kadir was born in 1872 in the clannish village to a strong Shia family and died in December 1942. 

He was appointed as family head while his father wadero Abdul Hakim was still alive in 1897. He was a member of the British Empire League. After receiving the Afrin Nama honour and acknowledgement from the Commissioner in Sind Arthar Delaval Younghusband during his camp office at Ratodero, Ghulam Kadir Dayo was given membership in the British Empire League. He was the first member from Larrkano Ratodero in 1909.

Donations Campaign, Imperial Relief fund. 

In 1916 there was a great need for financial donations. The Imperial sub-governing powers analyzed the situation and asked the landlords, traders, business man, contractors and industrials to mobilized resources to give donations voluntarily. Dayo generously donated and raised the funds which brought him to the attention of the Raj, Commissioner in Sind William Henry Lucas, CM Baker Collector of larrkano (CM Baker had 2nd tenure , earlier he was Collector in 1908) and  Mr. Allah Bukhsh Ansari Huzoor  deputy collector. They all mentioned him in reports to the governor at Bombay presidency Lord Willington and Viceroy Lord Chelmsford and due recognition was confirmed.

Imperial Relief Fund.  

The Imperial Relief Fund was deposited in the collector’s office and was to be sent further to the viceroy of India through proper government receipt. Each district had the Huzoor Deputy Collectors and were directed to collect the donations and acknowledge the services on behalf of the viceroy. Wadero generously donated money to the fund which was acknowledged by the viceroy Lord Chelmsford through district deputy collector larrkano in October 1916. He was honoured and appointed as Special Bench Magistrate and Justice of Peace by the viceroy of India. He also had the Right to Vote. He was Collector's and Commissioner's Kursi Nashen (Chair Holder).

See also 
 2019 Sindh HIV outbreak

References

 Tehsils & Unions in the District of Larkana - Government of Pakistan

Populated places in Sindh
Larkana District